RDNA or rDNA may stand for:

ribosomal DNA, DNA sequence that codes for ribosomal RNA
recombinant DNA, DNA molecules
RDNA (microarchitecture), Radeon DNA, a GPU architecture by AMD 
Reformed Druids of North America, an American Neo-Druidic organization